Tlyanada is a rural locality (a selo) in Kolobsky Selsoviet, Tlyaratinsky District, Republic of Dagestan, Russia. The population was 485 as of 2010.

Geography 
Tlyanada is located 29 km southeast of Tlyarata (the district's administrative centre) by road. Kolob is the nearest rural locality.

References 

Rural localities in Tlyaratinsky District